Cosmosoma remota is a moth of the subfamily Arctiinae. It was described by Francis Walker in 1854. It can be found in Venezuela.

References

remota
Moths described in 1854